Chilbili is a village in Kudra block of Kaimur district, Bihar, India. As of 2011, its population was 2,427, in 428 households.

References 

Villages in Kaimur district